White Flight is the solo project of Justin Roelofs, longtime musician and former singer/songwriter/guitarist for The Anniversary. Roelofs recorded a self-titled debut album at both a former neighbor and long-time childhood friend's house in Overland Park, Kansas and several locations around Lawrence, Kansas.

Background 

"White Flight" is an assembly of sounds, both electronic and vocal. Roelofs recorded the sounds shortly after returning from what he describes as an enlightening exploration of traditional medicinal and hallucinogenic plants in the jungle of Peru. Roelofs had never performed any of the project's music live and left the United States prior to the album's release. He has subsequently returned and performed live as White Flight.

The album was originally released for download only, complete with album art and a 'making of' video from the label Range Life Records. Range Life Records, created by long-time friend Zach Hangauer, became distributed by Saddle Creek Records in February 2007, making "White Flight" widely available through online retailers and the iTunes Store.

On February 26, 2007, Pitchfork Media gave the album a 5.5 out of 10, claiming that the album lacked substance, suffers from "hippie poetry", and was "woefully disjointed."

In 2009, an album was leaked online entitled "White Ark." The album was never officially released.

A single from "White Ark", entitled "Panther", was released January 2010 on Range Life Records.

Another single, "Children of the Light" was also released by Range Life Records in 2010. This single featured the songs "Children of the Light" and "Thunder Over Thunder," both from White Ark.

In 2014, White Flight recorded with E*vax (of Ratatat) a self-titled album called ABUELA. A song called Sapa was released for free on SoundCloud, and the True Colors single came out in February 2014 on the label Canvasback. This single included the songs "True Colors," and "Honeybeez."

Discography
White Flight (2007 – Range Life)
White Ark (2009 – unreleased)
Panther (2010 – Range Life)
Children of the Light (2010 – Range Life)
"Panther"/"Children of the Light" 7" (2010 – Make Mine)

References
 Pitchfork Media review of White Flight

External links
Range Life Website

Rock music groups from Kansas